Silver Queen is a 1942 American Western film directed by Lloyd Bacon and starring George Brent and Priscilla Lane. The film was nominated for two Academy Awards; one for Best Score and one for Best Art Direction (Ralph Berger, Emile Kuri).

Plot
After discovering her father has gone broke from the Crash of the Stock Market, a well-known and confident young woman, Coralie, from the Barbary Coast decides to give up her chance at love in order to succeed in card games.  She becomes a popular card dealer named the "Silver Queen".

Coralie Adams is torn between James Kincade, the dapper gambler she admires, and Gerald Forsythe, the responsible man her father has chosen for her to marry. But when her father loses the deed to a silver mine in a poker game, she leaves all that behind, relying on her own skill with cards and gambling to pay way and her family's debts. She starts a successful new life as the Silver Queen running her own gambling hall but the past returns and she is once again caught between her finance and the gambler.

Cast
 George Brent as James Kincaid
 Priscilla Lane as Coralie Adams
 Bruce Cabot as Gerald Forsythe
 Lynne Overman as Hector Bailey
 Eugene Pallette as Steve Adams
 Janet Beecher as Mrs. Laura Forsythe
 Guinn 'Big Boy' Williams as Blackie
 Frederick Burton as Dr. Hartley
 Spencer Charters as Doc Stonebraker
 Eleanor Stewart as Millicent Bailey
 Georges Renavent as Andres
 Marietta Canty as Ruby
 Sam McDaniel as Toby
 Herbert Rawlinson as Judge
 Arthur Hunnicutt as Newspaper Publisher Brett
 Francis X. Bushman as Creditor
 Jason Robards Sr. as Bank Teller (uncredited) 
 Fred Toones as Butler (uncredited)

References

External links

1942 films
1942 Western (genre) films
American Western (genre) films
American black-and-white films
Films scored by Victor Young
Films directed by Lloyd Bacon
United Artists films
1940s English-language films
1940s American films